Twelve ships of the Royal Navy have borne the name HMS Star or HMS Starr:

  was a 16-gun ship purchased in 1643 and sold in 1652.
  was a 4-gun fireship purchased in 1667 and expended that year.
  was an 8-gun bomb vessel launched in 1694 and purchased that year.  She was wrecked in 1712.
  was a 14-gun sloop purchased in 1779 and sold circa 1785.
  was an  that the Admiralty sold in 1802.
  was an 18-gun sloop launched in 1805. She was converted to an 8-gun bomb vessel in 1812 and was renamed HMS Meteor.  She was sold in 1816.
She was renamed HMS Star in 1814 and was sold in 1837.
  was a tender launched in 1808 and sold in 1828.
  was a packet brig launched in 1835. She was transferred to the Coastguard as a watchvessel in 1857 and was renamed WV 11 in 1863. She was broken up around 1899.
  was a wood screw sloop launched in 1860 and broken up in 1877.
She was launched in 1896 and sold in 1919.

See also
 
 , a Canadian Forces Naval Reserve division in Hamilton, Ontario

Battle Honours
 Dover 1652
 Martinique 1809
 Guadeloupe 1810

Royal Navy ship names